Hader is an unincorporated community in Goodhue County, Minnesota, United States.

The community is located at the junction of U.S. Highway 52, State Highway 57 (MN 57), and Goodhue County Road 8 (County 8 Boulevard).

Hader is located within Leon Township and Wanamingo Township.  Nearby places include Zumbrota, Wanamingo, Goodhue, Minneola Township, Belle Creek Township, and Cannon Falls.

ZIP codes 55992 (Zumbrota), 55983 (Wanamingo), 55009 (Cannon Falls), and 55027 (Goodhue) all meet near Hader.

History
When Hader was founded by Otis F. Smith in 1857, it was built in order to be the county seat.  However, these plans failed, the plat was not fulfilled, and few buildings were built during that time.

References

Unincorporated communities in Minnesota
Unincorporated communities in Goodhue County, Minnesota
1857 establishments in Minnesota Territory
Populated places established in 1857